Telephone recording may refer to:
Call-recording software
Telephone tapping